A foreign language is a language that is not an official language of, nor typically spoken in, a given country, and that native speakers from that country must usually acquire through conscious learning - be this through language lessons at school, self-teaching or attendance of language courses, for example. A foreign language may be learnt as a second language, but there is a distinction between the terms, as a second language may be used to describe a language that plays a significant role in the region where the speaker lives, whether for communication, education, business or governance, and therefore a second language is not necessarily a foreign language.

Children who learn more than one language from birth or from a very young age are considered bilingual or multilingual. These children can be said to have two, three or more mother tongues, and so again these languages would not be considered foreign to these children, even if one language is a foreign language for the vast majority of people in the child's birth country. For example, a child learning English from his English father and Irish at school in Ireland can speak both English and Irish, but neither is a foreign language to them. This is common in countries such as India, South Africa, or Canada due to these countries having multiple official languages.

In general, it is believed that children have advantage to learning a foreign language over adults. However, studies have shown that pre-existing knowledge of language and grammar rules, and a superior ability to memorise vocabulary may benefit adults when learning foreign languages.

Foreign-language education and ability

Most schools around the world teach at least one foreign language and most colleges and high schools require foreign language before graduation.  By 1998, nearly all pupils in Europe studied at least one foreign language as part of their compulsory education, the only exception being Ireland, where primary and secondary schoolchildren learn both Irish and English, but neither is considered a foreign language (although Irish pupils do study a third European language). On average in Europe, at the start of foreign-language teaching, learners have lessons for three to four hours a week. Compulsory lessons in a foreign language normally start at the end of primary school or the start of secondary school. In Luxembourg, Norway and Malta, however, the first foreign language is studied at age six, and in Flanders at age 10. In Wales, all children are taught Welsh from the first year of primary school. The Welsh language is also compulsory up to the age of 16, although a formal GCSE qualification is optional.

In some countries, learners have lessons taken entirely in a foreign language: for example, more than half of European countries with a minority/regional language community use partial immersion to teach both the minority and the state language. This method is also highly used in Canada, wherein anglophone students spend all of most of their lessons learning the materials in French.

In 1995, the European Commission's White Paper on Education and Training emphasised the importance of schoolchildren learning at least two foreign languages before upper secondary education. The Lisbon Summit of 2000 defined languages as one of the five key skills.

Despite the high rate of foreign-language teaching in schools, the number of adults claiming to speak a foreign language is generally lower than might be expected. This is particularly true of native English speakers: in 2004 a British survey by recruitment firm Office Angels showed that fewer than one in 10 UK workers could speak a foreign language and that less than 5% could count to 20 in a second language. In 2012, a European Commission survey found that 61% of respondents in the UK were unlikely to speak any language other than their mother tongue (page 5).

Since the 1990s, the Common European Framework of Reference for Languages has tried to standardise the learning of languages across Europe.

An article from The Atlantic claims that only 1 percent of the adults within the US population consider themselves proficient in speaking a foreign language. This is in stark contrast to many other countries, where the percentage is much higher. Even though there are many benefits that come with learning a foreign language, schools across the United States continue to cut foreign language from their budgets.

Pronunciation

Instruments for foreign-language learning

In recent years, computer-assisted language learning has been integrated into foreign-language education and computer programs with varying levels of interactional relationship between computer and the language learner have been developed. Language learning aids such as foreign-language writing aid and foreign-language reading aid, targeted at the specific language skills of foreign-language learners, are also alternative instruments available for foreign-language learners.

Research into foreign-language learning

In 2004, a report by the Michel Thomas Language Centre in the United Kingdom suggested that speaking a second language could increase an average worker's salary by £3000 (€3 300) a year, or £145 000 (€159 000) in a lifetime. Further results showed that nine out of 10 British companies thought their businesses could benefit from better language skills. Studies show that a bilingual or multilingual person can earn much more than a computer programmer or engineer because they can use their abilities in foreign language to obtain success in a wide range of career paths. In addition, due to the increase in the number of people from different parts of the world, a multilingual person can more easily communicate with prospective customers.

Also in 2004, a study by University College London (UCL) examined the brains of 105 people who could speak more than one language. The study found that people who learned a second language when younger had denser grey matter than those who learned one later. Grey matter is an area of the brain where information is most efficiently processed, due to the function of specific nerve cells.

A series of experiments on more than 300 people from the U.S. and Korea found that thinking in a second language reduced deep-seated, misleading biases that unduly influence how risks and benefits are perceived.

Other research has shown that early exposure to a second language increases divergent thinking strategies, helping not only in language-related tasks, but also in areas such as math.  Children early on have different ways of expressing themselves, such that they better understand there is more than one way to look at a problem and that there is more than one solution.

Foreign language versus second language

Although significant differences between the definitions of second language and foreign language may be hard to find as the two terms are often taken as synonyms, research has been carried out to shed light on the differentiating traits of the two. The distinction between acronyms TESL (Teaching of English as a Second Language) and TEFL (Teaching of English as a Foreign Language) shows the attention different researchers have paid to the concepts of foreign language and second language.

Richards and Schmidt (2002: 472) provide the following information about second language:

"In a broad sense, any language learned after one has learnt one's native language [is called second language]. However, when contrasted with foreign language, the term refers more narrowly to a language that plays a major role in a particular country or region though it may not be the first language of many people who use it. For example, the learning of English by immigrants in the US or the learning of Catalan by speakers of Spanish in Catalonia (an autonomous region of Spain) are cases of second (not foreign) language learning, because those languages are necessary for survival in those societies. English is also a second language for many people in countries like Nigeria, India, Singapore and the Philippines (plus Spanish), because English fulfills many important functions in those countries (including the business of education and government) and Learning English is necessary to be successful within that context. (Some people in these countries however may acquire English as a first language, if it is the main language used at home)."

They also define a foreign language as a language which is not the native language of large numbers of people in a particular country of region, is not used as a medium of instruction in schools and is not widely used as a medium of communication in government, media, etc. They note that foreign languages are typically taught as school subjects for the purpose of communicating with foreigners or for reading printed materials in the language (Richards and Schmidt, 2002: 206).

Crystal (2003) notes that first language is distinguishable from second language (a language other than one's mother-tongue used for a special purpose, e.g. for education, government) distinguishable in turn from foreign language (where no such special status is implied). He also notes that the distinction between the latter two is not universally recognised (especially not in the USA).

Stern (1983) believes that there is today consensus that a necessary distinction is to be made between a non-native language learnt and used within one country to which the term second language has been applied and a non-native language learnt and used with reference to a speech community outside national or territorial boundaries to which the term foreign language is commonly given. He argues that while the distinction between 'second' and 'foreign' has a certain justification, it is perhaps less important than it has sometimes been made out to be and it may be misleading. He notes that the distinction became popular after World War II in international organisations, such as UNESCO, in order to meet nationalist susceptibilities in discussions on language questions.

Fasold and Connor-Linton (2006), Falk (1978) and Hudson (2000) provide similar definitions for the two terms. O'Grady et al. (1384) don't mention the exact terms 'second' and 'foreign' language, but they emphasise on the role of learning environment in teaching non-native languages.

So, the distinction between 'second language' and 'foreign language' is a geographical and environmental distinction. We can mention 'second-language situation' and 'foreign-language situation' as two situations of learning, not two kinds of languages. So a foreign language is not always a foreign language and a second language is not always a second language. Since the distinction is geographical, the two situations (learning second language and learning foreign language) can be considered as a continuum. At one extreme, we may find learners learning without external help and direction purely from exposure to the non-native language through living in the target language environment (second-language learning) and at the other we find learners learning the non-native language exclusively in language teaching setting and classrooms (foreign-language learning).

A 'second language' usually has official status or a recognised function within a country which a foreign language has not and furthermore these two different situations frequently have important consequences to which attention has been drawn in some books. For example, Persian is a second language for Kurdish people, but not vice versa, because there is no Kurdish environment for Persian speakers who are learning Kurdish. On the other hand, English is a foreign language for both groups, because there is no contact between Kurdish and Persian people with English people. However, if an Iranian person goes to United States, then English becomes a second language for them. Thus, British immigrants to Iran learn Persian as a second language, and Persian speakers study English in Britain as a second language. Meanwhile, people in Kurdistan can speak of learning Kurdish by Persian speakers as a second rather than foreign language.

The purposes of second-language learning are often different from foreign-language learning. Second language is needed for full participation in the political and economic life of the nation, because it is frequently the official language or one of two or more recognised languages. It may be the language needed for education. Among the purposes of foreign-language learning are traveling abroad, communication with native speakers, reading foreign literature or scientific and technical works.

There are some major differences between foreign and second language teaching and learning. In second-language learning, one can receive input for learning both inside and outside the classroom. They can readily put to use what is learned, as can the child learning its first language, so much naturalistic practice is possible.

Second-language learners are usually more successful in developing non-native language skills and what is learned may be essential for getting along in the community, so motivation is stronger.

Acculturation that is a main aspect of learning a language is easier in the case of second-language learning and the emotional role of language (as opposed to communicational role) is easier to use for learners.

The major characteristics of the planned condition of the classroom in the case of foreign-language learning as opposed to natural conditions of second-language learning are:

 Psycho-social demands of classroom: The school classroom requires adjustment of the learner to the group processes, classroom discipline and procedures. The learner receives only a limited amount of individual attention. Regular attendance is required.
 Preselected language data: The teacher generally introduces preselected target language items. Spontaneity is limited. A planned curriculum is followed with the teacher attempting to realize certain goals regarding the language that is to be learned.
 Grammatical rules presented. The teacher may describe a rule in the native language to explain a grammatical structure. The teacher is expected to understand, assimilate and later apply the abstract rule.
 Unreal limited situations. Situations for language use in the classroom are limited in variety and scope as compared to those outside of the classroom. The situations which are employed are often simulated.
 Educational aids and assignments. In order to assist learning and achieve teacher goals, books, writing or a language lab, for example, may be used. Work assignments may be given to be completed in the class or at home.

There are some other issues in teaching and learning foreign language and second language including the type of motivation and the distinction between 'learning' and 'acquisition' that I will discuss them in separate parts.

Acquisition versus learning
There is often a distinction between acquisition and learning in linguistic and pedagogic literature. Children are described as 'acquiring' their native language, where there is no previous information and knowledge in their mind. On the other hand, adults are said to 'learn' a non-native language. Acquisition is viewed as a natural, unconscious, untaught, and probably unteachable process, while learning is somewhat artificial, usually conscious and possibly dependent on instruction and study.

The distinction between acquisition and learning can be used in this discussion, because the general conditions in the case of second language offer opportunities for acquisition, because it is informal, free, undirected or naturalistic. On the other hand, educational treatment in the case of foreign language may offer opportunities mainly for learning.

Nevertheless, acquisition can take place in the case of foreign-language learning and learning can take place in the case of second-language learning. For example, immigrants to the US can attend language teaching classes in the target language environment. On the other hand, foreign-language learners that are far from target language environment can sometimes acquire some points for example by listening to foreign radio, reading literature etc.

See also
 First language
 Foreign-language influences in English
 Fremdsprachen und Hochschule
 International auxiliary language
 Language education
 Language exchange
 Language Resource Center
 Language school
 Learning by teaching
 Multilingualism
 Official language
 Second language
 Teaching English as a foreign language

Footnotes

References

Sources
 Bailey, David. "The Secret to Learning a Foreign Language as an Adult. " Time. Time, 2 Oct. 2014. Web.
 Crystal, D. (2003), A Dictionary of Linguistics and Phonetics, 5th edition, London: Blackwell.
 Falk, J.S. (1978), Linguistics and Language, USA: John Wiley & Sons.
 Fasold, R.W. and Connor-Linton J. (2006), An Introduction to Language and Linguistics, Cambridge: Cambridge University Press.
 Hudson, G. (2000), Essential Introductory Linguistics, London: Blackwell.
 Merritt, Anne. "Are Children Really Better at Foreign Language Learning?" The Telegraph. Telegraph Media Group, 18 Sept. 2013. Web.
 Richards, J.C. and Schmidt R. (2002), Longman Dictionary of Language Teaching and Applied Linguistics, 3rd edition, London: Longman.
 Service, Elisabet, et al. "Adults' And 8-Year-Olds' Learning In A Foreign Word Repetition Task: Similar And Different."Language Learning 64.2 (2014): 215-246. Communication & Mass Media Complete. Web.
 Steinberg, D. D. (1991), Psycholinguistics: Language, Mind and World, London: Longman.
 Stern, H.H. (1983), Fundamental Concepts of Language Teaching. Oxford: Oxford University Press.
 Sanfins, Nuno (2018), "TEFL or TESL? A study of Language development and progression."

Sociolinguistics
Language education
Multilingualism